The Rally Sweden, formerly the International Swedish Rally, and later the Uddeholm Swedish Rally, is an automobile rally competition held in February in Värmland, Sweden and relocated to Umeå in 2022. First held in 1950, as a summer rally called the Rally to the Midnight Sun with start and finish at separate locations, seventeen years later both start and finish became located in Karlstad. The main service park is located in the town of Torsby, which is actually much closer to the special stages than Karlstad. The competition is spread out over three days with the start of the first part on Friday morning and the finish on Sunday afternoon.

In 1973 the rally was introduced to the World Rally Championship and started to get international attention; the Swedish Rally has been also traditionally the only rally held on snow. Like Rally Finland, this rally is known to be very difficult for non-Nordic drivers. The first winning driver of the Swedish Rally that wasn't from Sweden or Finland was Frenchman Sébastien Loeb in 2004, Frenchman Sébastien Ogier was the second non-Nordic winner with wins in 2013, 2015 and 2016 with Belgian Thierry Neuville and Estonian Ott Tänak also recording wins in 2018 and 2019 respectively. Spaniard Carlos Sainz finished second four times and third two times.

The rally has been cancelled three times; in 1974 due to the oil crisis, in 1990 because of the mild weather and in 2021 due to COVID-19 pandemic. The rally was also not held in 2009 due to the WRC's round rotation system. Weather continues to be a concern, as rising global temperatures reduce the likelihood of appropriately snowy conditions every year. The 2005 event was one of the warmest ever, turning many stages into mud and destroying the special studded snow tires used by the teams.

In 2021 it was announced that Rally Sweden would relocate to the northern Swedish city of Umeå after being held in the province of Värmland since its foundation. The primary reason for its relocation was that Umeå is considered a more snow safe region.

Results

1950 through 1969

1970 through 1985

1986 through 1999

2000—

Multiple winners

See also
Colin's Crest

References

External links

Swedish Rally Roll of Honour at Rallybase

Recurring sporting events established in 1950
1950 establishments in Sweden
Sweden
February sporting events
Sweden